Harold Benjamin "Bo" Hagan (October 8, 1925 – January 22, 2002) was an American football and baseball player, football coach, and college athletics administrator.  He served as head football coach at Rice University from 1967 from 1970, compiling a record of 12–27–1. Before serving as head coach, Hagan was the backfield coach at Rice for 11 seasons.  Hagan was the athletic director at the University of South Carolina from 1975 to 1976.

Coaching career
Hagan was a high school football coach in Atlanta before serving as freshmen football coach at the Georgia Institute of Technology under Bobby Dodd from 1951 to 1953.  He moved to Southern Methodist University in 1954, where he worked for two seasons as backfield coach with Woody Woodard.  In 1956, Jess Neely hired Hagan as his backfield coach at Rice University.  He assisted Neely for 11 seasons before succeeding him as head coach after the 1966 campaign.

Head coaching record

References

External links
 

1925 births
2002 deaths
American football quarterbacks
Minor league baseball players
Georgia Tech Yellow Jackets football coaches
Rice Owls athletic directors
Rice Owls football coaches
SMU Mustangs football coaches
South Carolina Gamecocks athletic directors
South Carolina Gamecocks baseball players
South Carolina Gamecocks football players
High school football coaches in Georgia (U.S. state)
Players of American football from Savannah, Georgia
Baseball players from Savannah, Georgia